Alfredo Antonio Carlo Buongusto (6 April 1935 – 8 November 2019), known by his stage name Fred Bongusto, was an Italian light music singer, songwriter and composer who was very popular in the 1960s and 1970s.

Career history
Bongusto was born in Campobasso. He made his recording debut with the song "Bella Bellissima", a song written by Ghigo Agosti and produced by the Milan-based label Primary. It was released on phonographic record in 1960. Some of his most successful songs include "Amore fermati", "Una rotonda sul mare", "Spaghetti a Detroit" and "Prima c'eri tu", which won the 1966 edition of Un disco per l'estate. Bongusto's proclivity for exploring Latin American rhythms and American Big Band swing made him very popular in South America, especially in Brazil. He had collaborated with Toquinho, Vinicius de Moraes and João Gilberto, who successfully covered Bongusto's song "Malaga" in his 1991 album João.

He composed the soundtracks of more than 30 films, including Day After Tomorrow (1968), Un Detective (1969), The Divorce (1970), Come Have Coffee with Us (1970), The Eroticist (1972), Gli ordini sono ordini (1972), Bianco, rosso e... (1972), Malizia (1973), Lovers and Other Relatives (1974), Le farò da padre (1974), Conviene far bene l'amore (1975), Al piacere di rivederla (1976), Oh, Serafina! (1976), The Cricket (1980), Fantozzi contro tutti (1980), Fracchia la belva umana (1981) and Superfantozzi (1986). He also starred in Obiettivo ragazze (1961), and Questi pazzi, pazzi italiani (1965).

In the 1990s, he was elected as a PSI town councillor in Bari. On 18 March 2005, the President of the Council, Silvio Berlusconi, presented him with a silver plate to celebrate the 50th anniversary of his musical debut. On 2 June 2005, he was awarded the title of Commendatore by President Carlo Azeglio Ciampi.

Personal life
He was married to Gabriella Palazzoli, an Italian soubrette, who was famous in the 1950s and 1960s. She is known for starring in the film Buonanotte... Avvocato! with Alberto Sordi.

In 1960, before their marriage, Palazzoli had a previous marriage with American actor John Drew Barrymore, who is the father of her daughter Blyth Dolores. Blyth was raised by Bongusto.

Bongusto spent much of his time in Ischia, in the village of Sant'Angelo. Bongusto died in Rome on 8 November 2019. He was 84.

Discography
1963 - Fred Bongusto
1964 - La notte è fatta per ballare
1966 - ...forse è colpa della musica...
1970 - Alla mia maniera
1971 - Un'occasione per dirti che ti amo
1972 - Alfredo Antonio Carlo Bongusto
1972 - Alla mia maniera n° 2
1974 - Malizia... un po'...
1974 - Doppio Whisky
1974 - Italian graffiti
1975 - Noi innamorati... d'improvviso
1975 - Napoli alla mia maniera
1976 - Flashback
1976 - La mia estate con te
1977 - Il giorno e la notte
1978 - Professionista di notte
1979 - Lunedì
1979 - Fred Brasil
1980 - Fred & Bongusto
1981 - Fortunatamente ancora l'amore
1982 - Freddissimo
1983 - Belle bugie
1984 - Appuntamento con la luna
1985 - ...dillo tu
1986 - Guancia a guancia
1987 - Cioccolata
1988 - Paradiso perduto
1989 - Le donne più belle
1990 - Appena posso, torno
1991 - Una canzone per ballare
1992 - Io dopo i giorni degli azzimi
1992 - Ancora insieme/We'll Be Together Again
1992 - Bailemos
1994 - Facciamo finta di volerci bene...
1995 - Fred
1997 - E io le canto accussì
1997 - La luna

References

External links
 
 

1935 births
2019 deaths
Italian male singers
Italian film score composers
Italian male film score composers
Crooners
People from Campobasso
Nastro d'Argento winners